Dane pri Divači is a small village south of Divača in the Littoral region of Slovenia.

Name
Dane was attested in written sources  1400 as Podenn, and in 1412 as zw Podem, both German names. The semantically equivalent Slovene name is derived from the Slavic common noun *dъno '(valley) bottom, valley floor', referring to a place where flowing water disappears into the ground. There are several losing streams in the area. The name of the settlement was changed from Dane to Dane pri Divači in 1952.

History
According to oral tradition, the village formerly stood at a higher elevation slightly south of its present location. The microtoponym Stare Dane 'old Dane' is used for this site.

References

External links
Dane pri Divači on Geopedia

Populated places in the Municipality of Divača